The Joy Baluch AM Bridge is a bridge across Spencer Gulf between Port Augusta and Port Augusta West in South Australia. It carries Highway 1 and is a key road link on both east–west and north–south road routes in Australia. The western end leads to Eyre Peninsula, the Eyre Highway (to Western Australia) and the Stuart Highway (to the Northern Territory). The eastern end leads to the Augusta Highway towards Adelaide, Victoria and New South Wales.

The bridge was opened in 1972. In 2012 it was named after Joy Baluch who had been mayor of Port Augusta for forty years.

Great Western Bridge
The current bridge replaced an earlier bridge known as the Great Western Bridge which had been built in 1927. It was rebuilt and widened in 1944. The older bridge is still visible north of the current crossing. Until 2017 it had continued to be used as a pedestrian and cycling bridge, and for recreational fishing. An engineering report identified that the structure of the 90-year-old timber bridge was failing and needed significant investment to remain safe for public access, so the bridge was closed. When access to the old bridge was closed, the speed limit on the main bridge was initially reduced to 25 km/h to provide safety for the increased cyclist and pedestrian traffic. This was then raised to 40 km/h which is expected to remain until the new bridge is completed.

Bridge duplication
As of March 2020, The bridge is being duplicated by adding a second two-lane bridge immediately north of the original bridge. This will be funded by $160 million by the Federal Government and $40 million by the Government of South Australia and is expected to be completed in 2022. Both bridges will have two-way shared pedestrian/cycling paths separated from the road traffic.

The contract for detailed design and construction was let in March 2020 to the Port Wakefield to Port Augusta Alliance, a consortium of CPB Contractors, Aurecon and GHD Group. This consortium is also responsible for the overpass and duplication on Port Wakefield Road near Port Wakefield.

References

Bridges in South Australia
Eyre Peninsula
Spencer Gulf
Bridges completed in 1972
1972 establishments in Australia